The 1955–56 season was the 41st in the history of the Isthmian League, an English football competition.

Wycombe Wanderers were champions, winning their first Isthmian League title.

League table

References

Isthmian League seasons
I